The 1924 United States Senate election in Alabama was held on November 4, 1924.

Incumbent U.S. Senator James Thomas Heflin, who had been elected to complete the unfinished term of John H. Bankhead in 1920, was elected to a full term in office over Republican Frank J. Lathrop.

General election

Candidates
James Thomas Heflin, incumbent Senator since 1920 (Democratic)
Frank H. Lathrop (Republican)

Results

See also 
 1924 United States Senate elections

References

1924
Alabama
1924 Alabama elections